The men's pommel horse competition at the 2012 Olympic Games was held at the North Greenwich Arena on 28 July and 5 August. It included 69 competitors from 32 nations.

Krisztián Berki of Hungary won the gold medal. It was Hungary's first victory in the pommel horse since 1988 and fifth overall, tying the Soviet Union for the most all-time. Great Britain's Louis Smith and Max Whitlock won silver and bronze, respectively. Smith, who had won bronze in 2008, was the 10th man to win multiple medals in the event. It was the first time since 1984 that one nation earned multiple medals in the pommel horse.

Background

This was the 23rd appearance of the event in the Olympics. Three of the eight finalists from 2008 returned: silver medalist Filip Ude of Croatia, bronze medalist Louis Smith of Great Britain, and sixth-place finisher Kim Ji-hoon of South Korea. Krisztián Berki of Hungary had won the last two world championships, in 2010 and 2011. Smith had also medaled at both of those world championships, and Cyril Tommasone of France was the runner-up in 2011.

Azerbaijan, Hong Kong, and Lithuania each made their debut in the men's pommel horse. The United States made its 21st appearance, the most of any nation.

Competition format
The top eight competitors in the qualification phase (with a limit of two per country) advanced to the apparatus final. Qualification scores were then erased, with only final-round scores counting.

Final results

*The tie for first was broken by the execution score; Berki's E score of 9.166 was higher than Smith's E score of 9.066.

References

Gymnastics at the 2012 Summer Olympics
2012
2012
Men's events at the 2012 Summer Olympics